"Good Day" is the debut single by The Dresden Dolls duo, taken from the self-titled debut album The Dresden Dolls. It was originally released by Important Records in December 2003 in an edition of 500 on white vinyl. The set also included a photograph signed by Amanda Palmer and Brian Viglione. The 7" was later reissued in October 2005 on Palmer's own 8 Ft. Records during the band's Fall 2005 North American tour. The cover of the reissue depicted a painting by Barnaby Whitfield that recreated the photo from the original release.

In The Dresden Dolls Companion, Amanda Palmer has published the lyrics, sheet music, history, and creative process for this single.

The B-side, "A Night at the Roses," features a noticeably different sound from the band's usual material, with Palmer contributing vocals and tambourine, and Viglione playing the electric guitar. The song was only available on this single on vinyl until 2007, when Important included it on the IMPREC100 - A Users Guide to the First 100 Important Releases compilation CD. The song was also made available as part of a digital download for No, Virginia... on June 10, 2008 and as an unlisted bonus track with the full album download for the A Is for Accident re-release at bandcamp.com.

Track listing
Side A: "Good Day" - 5:51
Side B: "A Night At the Roses" - 4:54

Personnel
Amanda Palmer - piano, organ, vocals, lyricist
Brian Viglione - drums, guitar, backing vocals
Ad Frank - guitar ("Good Day")
Shawn Setaro - bass ("Good Day")

Notes

External links
 The Dresden Dolls official site including lyrics and downloads

The Dresden Dolls songs
2003 singles
Songs written by Amanda Palmer
2001 songs